An annular solar eclipse occurred on January 25, 1963. A solar eclipse occurs when the Moon passes between Earth and the Sun, thereby totally or partly obscuring the image of the Sun for a viewer on Earth. An annular solar eclipse occurs when the Moon's apparent diameter is smaller than the Sun's, blocking most of the Sun's light and causing the Sun to look like an annulus (ring). An annular eclipse appears as a partial eclipse over a region of the Earth thousands of kilometres wide. The path of annularity crossed Chile, Argentina, South Africa, southern Basutoland (today's Lesotho) and Malagasy Republic (today's Madagascar). Occurring 3.7 days before perigee (Perigee on January 29, 1963), the Moon's apparent diameter was larger. The moon was 374,860 km (232,927 mi) from the Earth.

The moon's apparent diameter was 4.8 arcseconds larger than the July 20, 1963 total solar eclipse. This was an annular solar eclipse because it occurred in January and in January the earth is near its perihelion (closest approach to the Sun).

Related eclipses

Solar eclipses of 1961–1964

Saros 140 

It is a part of Saros cycle 140, repeating every 18 years, 11 days, containing 71 events. The series started with partial solar eclipse on April 16, 1512. It contains total eclipses from July 21, 1656 through November 9, 1836, hybrid eclipses from November 20, 1854, through December 23, 1908, and annular eclipses from January 3, 1927 through December 7, 2485. The series ends at member 71 as a partial eclipse on June 1, 2774. The longest duration of totality was 4 minutes, 10 seconds on August 12, 1692.

Metonic series

Notes

References

1963 1 25
1963 in science
1963 01 25
January 1963 events